Leah Taylor Roy  ( Taylor; born 1960/1961) is a Canadian politician who was elected to the riding of Aurora—Oak Ridges—Richmond Hill as a member of the Liberal Party in the 2021 Canadian federal election. She defeated incumbent Leona Alleslev.

Personal life 
Leah Taylor Roy was born in Newmarket, Ontario, second daughter to parents Tom Taylor and Kate (Nee Hendrika Posthumus)Taylor. Her father, a first-generation immigrant born to Irish and English parents, moved to Newmarket as a young boy. His mother owned a small groceteria for many years and his father worked in a factory and then for the Town of Newmarket. In addition to being a business owner, Tom was a Town Councillor, Regional Councillor, and served 3 terms as Mayor of Newmarket (1997- 2006). Kate immigrated with her family from the Netherlands after WW2 and grew up on a dairy farm in Owen Sound with her parents and 6 siblings. Kate went on to become a Registered Practical Nurse. Leah’s parents remain involved in community and charitable organizations and set the example of the importance of community service for their family. Leah’s brother, John Taylor, was a Regional Councillor for York County and is now serving his second term as mayor of Newmarket. Her sister, Theresa Taylor is a secondary and special needs teacher and her sister, India Taylor, is a retired nurse. Leah is married to Peter Roy, a native of Massachusetts, and together they have raised six children and have two granddaughters. They currently live in Aurora, Ontario.

Education and career 
After graduating as an Ontario Scholar from Newmarket High School, Leah attended Trinity College at the University of Toronto where she received a Bachelor of Commerce in Finance  She then went on to Harvard University where, while studying at the Kennedy School of Government she worked as a teaching assistant and with the Dean of the law school. In addition to her core studies, she took classes at the MIT Sloan School of Business, the Harvard Business School, and The Fletcher School of Law and Diplomacy, and studied French at Harvard Yard. She graduated with a Master's of Public Policy with a focus on finance and international development. Leah’s passion for public policy and business led her to a position with the World Bank. She worked there in both policy analysis and Treasury. Leah then joined the global management consulting firm of  McKinsey and Company in the Toronto office where she worked across Canada for major Canadian corporations in every region and sector of the economy. Although based in Toronto Leah also worked in New York where she met her husband, Peter Roy. She later joined and helped to build his family’s cogeneration company. She was an Executive Vice-President until the company was sold.

Electoral history

References

External links

Living people
21st-century Canadian politicians
21st-century Canadian women politicians
Liberal Party of Canada MPs
Members of the House of Commons of Canada from Ontario
University of Toronto alumni
Harvard Kennedy School alumni
Women members of the House of Commons of Canada
McKinsey & Company people
World Bank people
Canadian consultants
Year of birth missing (living people)
Canadian people of English descent
Canadian people of Irish descent